{{Infobox settlement
| name                     = Ahmednagar district
| settlement_typ33333e          = District of Maharashtra
| total_type               = Total
| native_name              = 
| image_skyline            = 
| image_caption            = Clockwise from top-left: Tomb of Salabat Khan II, tomb of Meher Baba, Arthur Lake at Bhandardara, Kalabhairav Pinnacle at Harishchandragad, Amruteshwar Temple at Ratangad
| image_map                = Ahmednagar in Maharashtra (India).svg
| image_map1               = 
| map_alt                  = 
| map_caption              = Location in Maharashtra
| coordinates              = 
| coor_pinpoint            = Ahmednagar
| subdivision_type         = Country
| subdivision_name         = 
| subdivision_type1        = State
| subdivision_name1        = Maharashtra
| subdivision_type2        = Division
| subdivision_name2        = Nashik
| established_title        = Established
| established_date         = 
| seat_type                = Headquarters
| seat                     = Ahmednagar
| parts_type               = Tehsils
| parts_style              = para
| p1                       = Akole, Jamkhed, Karjat, Kopargaon, Nagar, Nevasa, Parner, Pathardi, Rahata, Rahuri, Sangamner, Shevgaon, Shrigonda, Shrirampur
| area_total_km2           = 17048
| area_footnotes           = 
| population_as_of         = 2011
| population_total         = 4,543,159
| population_footnotes     = 
| population_urban         = 17.67%
| population_density_km2   = auto
| demographics_type1       = Demographics
| demographics1_title1     = Literacy
| demographics1_info1      = 80.22%
| demographics1_title2     = Sex ratio
| demographics1_info2      = 934
| governing_body           = Ahmednagar Zilla Parishad
| leader_title             = Guardian Minister
| leader_name              = Radhakrishna Vikhe Patil 
| leader_title1            = President Zilla Parishad
| leader_name1             = *President Mrs. Rajshritai Ghule
Vice President Mr. Pratap Shelke
| leader_title2            = District Collector
| leader_name2             = *Dr. Rajendra Bhosale (IAS)
| leader_title3            = CEO Zilla Parishad
| leader_name3             = *Mr. Sambhaji Langore (IAS)
| leader_title4            = MPs
| leader_name4             = *Sujay Vikhe Patil 
Sadashiv Lokhande 
| timezone1                = IST
| utc_offset1              = +05:30
| registration_plate       = MH-16 MH-17 and MH-51
| blank_name_sec1          = Major highways
| blank_info_sec1          = NH-50, NH-222
SH-10
| blank_name_sec2          = Average annual precipitation
| blank_info_sec2          = 501 mm
| website                  = 
| official_name            = 
}}Ahmednagar district (Marathi pronunciation: [əɦ(ə)məd̪nəɡəɾ]) is the largest district of Maharashtra state in western India. The historical Ahmednagar city is the headquarters of the district. Ahmednagar and Sangamner are largest cities in the district. Ahmednagar was the seat of the Ahmednagar Sultanate of late medieval period (1496–1636 CE). This district is known for the towns of Shirdi associated with Sai Baba, Meherabad associated with Meher Baba, Shani Shinganapur with Shanidev, and Devgad with Lord Dattatreya. Ahmednagar district is part of Nashik Division. The district is bordered by Aurangabad district to the northeast, Nashik district to the northwest, Thane and Pune districts to the southwest, Solapur district to the south and Beed district to the southeast.

Officer

Members of ParliamentSujay Vikhe Patil (BJP) - AhmednagarSadashiv Lokhande (SHS) Shirdi
 
Guardian Minister

list of Guardian Minister 

District Magistrate/Collector
 

list of District Magistrate / Collector 

Tourism
Ahmednagar Fort
Bhandardara
Harishchandragad
Kalsubai
Nighoj 
Shani Shingnapur
Shirdi
SiddhatekDevgad - Shree Datt Mandir Newasa -' Pais Khamb MandirHistory
Although Ahmednagar district was created as early as in 1818, modern history of Ahmednagar may be said to have commenced from 1869, the year in which parts of Nashik and Solapur which till then had comprised Nagar were separated and the present Nagar district was formed. Ahmednagar District was created after the defeat of the Maratha Confederacy in the Third Anglo-Maratha War in 1818, when most of the Peshwa's domains were annexed to British India. The district remained part of the Central division of Bombay Presidency until India's independence in 1947, when it became part of Bombay State, and in 1960 the new state of Maharashtra.

Economy
In 2006 the Ministry of Panchayati Raj named Ahmednagar one of the country's 250 most backward districts (out of a total of 640). It is one of the twelve districts in Maharashtra currently receiving funds from the Backward Regions Grant Fund Programme (BRGF).

Ahmednagar is Maharashtra's most advanced district in many ways. It has the maximum number of sugar factories, perhaps to spread the message of “Rural Prosperity through Cooperation” it gave the country half a century ago. The first cooperative sugar factory in Asia was established at Pravanagar. A role model of water conservation work can be seen at Ralegaon Siddhi, which is also called the Ideal Village. Newase where Dnyaneshwari was written, Shri Saibaba's Shirdi, one of Ashtavinayaks at Siddhatek, the famous Kanifnath temple, attract devotees. The Palace of Chand Bibi, the Bhandardara dam, Harishchandragad Fort, the Maldhok (Indian Bustard) sanctuary and the Rehkuri sanctuary are some of the places of tourist attraction.

Divisions
Ahmednagar district consists of fourteen talukas. These talukas are 

 Akole
 Jamkhed
 Karjat
 Kopargaon
 Nagar
 Nevasa
 Parner
 Pathardi
 Rahata
 Rahuri
 Sangamner
 Shevgaon
 Shrigonda
 Shrirampur.

Ahmednagar district has twelve Vidhan Sabha constituencies, six in each of the two parliamentary constituencies.

For the Shirdi Parliamentary Constituency (SC)
 #216 Akole (ST)
 #217 Sangamner
 #218 Shirdi
 #219 Kopergaon
 #220 Shrirampur (SC)
 #221 Newasa.

For the Ahmednagar Parliamentary Constituency
 #222 Shevgaon
 #223 Rahuri
 #224 Parner
 #225 Ahmednagar City
 #226 Shrigonda
 #227 Karjat-Jamkhed.

The Ahmednagar district is under proposal to be divided and a separate Sangamner district and it can be carved out of existing Ahmednagar district with the inclusion of the northern parts of Ahmednagar district which include Rahata, Rahuri, Shrirampur, Sangamner, Akole, Kopargaon, and Nevasa talukas in the proposed district. Sangamner is geographically at centre for ease of administration and well connected by Roads. Sangamner having its separate Vana Vibhag, Bandhakam Vibhag Office, District Court etc.

Ralegaon Siddhi is a village in the district that is considered a model of environmental conservation.

Demographics

In the 2011 census Ahmednagar district recorded a population of 4,543,159, roughly equal to the nation of Costa Rica or the US state of Louisiana. This gave it a ranking of 33rd among the districts of India (out of a total of 640). Its population growth rate over the decade 2001-2011 was 12.43%. Ahmadnagar had a sex ratio of 934 females for every 1000 males, and a literacy rate of 80.22%. Scheduled Castes and Scheduled Tribes made up 12.63% and 8.63% of the population respectively.

In the 2011 census, the vast majority of the population in Ahmednagar was Hindu, but there was a significant population of Muslims. Jains and Buddhists are small minorities.

At the time of the 2011 Census of India, 88.89% of the population in the district spoke Marathi, 4.74% Hindi and 2.74% Urdu as their first language. Other languages include Telugu and its dialect Waddar, as well as Marwari.

 Culture 
Islam arrived in Ahmednagar during the Tughlaq dynasty. There are many Muslim monuments like salabat khan's Tomb known as chandbibi, Faria Baug, Ground Fort and many dargas (mosques), and they are found in main town and cities.

Christianity arrived in the 18th century when the British took over the area from the Maratha empire onwards. Christianity has been Ahmednagar's third-largest religion, found all over the district except in the south-west. It is called as Jerusalem of Maharashtra. There is an ancient Hume Memorial Congregational Church in the city, which was built in 1833 by WIDER CHURCH MINISTRIES OF USA later known as American Marathi Mission. In Ahmednagar Christians are a result of the American Marathi mission and the mission of the Church of England's Society for the Propagation of the Gospel. During the British era Ahmednagar was part of Bombay presidency. The first Protestant Christian mission in the district was opened in 1831. Every village has one or more resident families as Christian and every village has its own church for worship. Ahmednagar's Christians are called Marathi Christians and a majority of them are Protestants.

Notable people
 C Ramchandra - Music Director and Playback singer.
 Meher Baba - spiritualist, has Ashram's in Meherabad & Meherazad, Ahmednagar
 Balasaheb Bharde (1912–2006), Former Minister, former speaker of the State Legislative Assembly and Padma Bhushan recipient.
 Anna Hazare - social activist
 Zaheer Khan, Indian Cricketer born at Shrirampur City on 7 October 1978, who has been a Key member of the Indian cricket team since 2000. He also played for Worcestershire in County Cricket and plays for Mumbai in Indian domestic cricket. He is currently the second-most successful Indian pace bowler in Test match cricket, behind Kapil Dev.
 B. J. Khatal-Patil Ex. Cabinet Minister of Maharashtra, a senior Maharashtra leader and a veteran Congressman.
 Indurikar Maharaj - comedian kirtankar, and social educator
 Dagdu Maruti Pawar (1935–1996), a Marathi author and poet known for his contributions to Dalit literature. He was born in Dhamangaon, Akole taluka.
 Ajinkya Rahane, Indian cricketer born at Ashvi village, Sangmner on 6 June 1988. 
 Bhausaheb Thorat (12 Jan 1924-14 Mar 2010), a leader of farmers and Indian National Congress legislator. He was well known in the cooperative movement, founder of the Sangamner Cooperative Sugar Mill, and former president of the Sangamner taluka and State Cooperative Bank. He is recognized for his work in Sangamner taluka and Akole taluka. Concerned about global warming, Bhausaheb Thorat has led a campaign to plant 45 million trees every year. In the epic Ramayana, the sage Agastya turned the arid Dandakaranya into a green heaven through a massive drive of tree planting. A book, The Man Who Planted Trees, an allegorical tale by French author Jean Giono, also inspired Bhausaheb Thorat. For this, he started the Dandakaranya Abhiyaan in June 2006 at Sangamner.
 Balasaheb Vikhe Patil - member of parliament and a former minister, Padma Bhushan recipient
 Vithalrao Vikhe Patil - Indian industrialist, the founder of the first sugar factory in the cooperative sector in India at Loni, in Maharashtra and the founder of a group of industries and institutions composed of Institute of Business Management and Rural Development, Padmashri Dr. Vithalrao Vikhe Patil Foundation's Medical College and Hospital and Padmashri Dr. Vitthalrao Vikhe Patil Sahakari Sakhar Karkhana Limited'', operating under Padmashree Dr. Vithalrao Foundation. The Government of India honoured him in 1961, with the award of Padma Shri, the fourth highest Indian civilian award for his services to the nation.

Villages
 

Dadh budruk

References

https://cultural.maharashtra.gov.in/english/gazetteer/Ahmadnagar/about_ahmadnagar.html

External links
 Travel to Ahmednagar 	
 Pictures of Ahmednagar
 Some more vintage pictures of Ahmednagar city
 Ahmednagar Directory

 
Districts of Maharashtra
States and territories established in 1818
Nashik division
1818 establishments in India